Majhwar is a poorly-attested Munda language, apparently related to or a dialect of Asuri, spoken in northern Chhattisgarh and Sonbhadra district of Uttar Pradesh by the Majhwar tribe.

Today all Majhwars record their mother tongue as Indo-Aryan languages like Chhattisgarhi, Surgujia and Sadri.

References

Languages of India
Munda languages